Mullakkara Retnakaran (born 9 May 1954) is an Indian politician from Kollam, Kerala and former Minister for Agriculture in Kerala. He is the State Executive Member of Communist Party of India CPI, Kerala since 2005. He is a Member in the 14th Kerala Legislative Assembly representing Chadayamangalam constituency in Kollam district since 2006. He is the Chairman of Legislative Committee on Environment, Kerala since 25 January 2019. He served as the Minister of Agriculture in the 12th Legislative assembly of Kerala.

Political career
Mullakkara Retnakaran became a member in Communist Party of India in 1978. He has served as All India Youth Federation (AIYF) State President and Secretary. During his political career, Retnakaran went to jail several times in connection with agitations, including "Job or Jail" strike.

Personal life
Retnakaran is the son of Purushothaman and Sulochana. He was born at Mullakkara, Kollam on 9 May 1954. He lives at Ambalakkara, Kottarakkara, Kollam. He is married to Geetha Raghavan. She retired as the Principal of CP Higher Secondary School, Kuttikkadu, Kadakkal.

Books

  Samarathanalil (സമരത്തണലിൽ), Published by Prabhath Book House in 2019.
  Mahabharathathiloode (മഹാഭാരതത്തിലൂടെ), Published by Sankeerthanam Publications in 2020.

See also 
 Kerala Council of Ministers

References

External links

Malayali politicians
People from Kollam district
1955 births
Living people
Communist Party of India politicians from Kerala
Kerala MLAs 2011–2016
Kerala MLAs 2016–2021